United Tote is an American company that provides totalizator equipment and services for parimutuel wagering at racetracks. It is owned by Churchill Downs, Inc.

History
United Tote was founded in the 1950s by the Shelhamer family of Montana.

The company made its initial public offering in 1984, raising $7 million.

In 1986, United Tote bought Sunland Park Racetrack in New Mexico for $3.5 million.

In 1989, United Tote purchased one of its largest competitors, Autotote Systems, from Thomas H. Lee. Before the two companies' operations could be integrated, the merger was challenged by federal antitrust regulators. A 1991 court ruling forced the company to split back up, and the original United Tote assets were sold back to the Shelhamer family.

In 1994, the company was purchased by Video Lottery Technologies, Inc., a maker of lottery equipment, for $19.6 million in cash, $10 million in promissory notes, and an earnout agreement worth up to $10 million. Video Lottery Technologies, later named Powerhouse Technologies, was acquired in 1999 by Anchor Gaming, which was then purchased in 2001 by International Game Technology (IGT). United Tote became part of IGT's newly formed lottery division.

IGT sold United Tote in 2003 for $12.3 million.

In 2006, Youbet.com purchased United Tote for $31.9 million plus $14.7 million in assumed debt.

United Tote became part of Churchill Downs, Inc. in 2010, when that company acquired Youbet.com.

References

External links

Churchill Downs Incorporated
Horse racing companies
Gambling companies of the United States